Downsview Park is a rapid transit station on Line 1 Yonge–University of the Toronto subway and a commuter rail station on the Barrie commuter rail line of GO Transit. Subway service began on December 17, 2017, and GO Train service began on December 30, 2017. Downsview Park station is a fully integrated multi-modal transit facility serving both transit lines. This is in contrast to other interchanges between TTC subway and GO Transit rail lines, which have separate structures for each agency.

TTC ridership statistics for 2018 showed that Downsview Park was the least used station on the heavy-rail subway system, displacing  on Line 4 Sheppard.

Services
TTC Line 1 operates every 5 minutes or better all day, every day.

The GO Transit Barrie Line operates approximately every 15–30 minutes during the morning peak period, every 30 minutes during the afternoon peak period, and every 60 minutes outside of peak periods including on weekends and holidays.

Subway station

Name
The station had been expected to be named "Sheppard West" and was officially referred to by that name during construction.

Approval was given in 2010 for the station to be named "Downsview Park", subject to the satisfactory resolution of negotiations between the Toronto Transit Commission, the City of Toronto, and the federally-managed Downsview Park related to property acquisition, and to rename the existing Downsview station to "Sheppard West".

Description

The subway platform is underground on an east–west axis parallel to Sheppard Avenue West. An intermediate concourse level is located below ground between the subway and GO platforms. GO Transit has committed to cost-sharing at this station. A new roadway named Vitti Street on the west side of the station provides vehicle access and passenger pick-up/drop-off. To the east and west of the station, the line swings broadly at a 90-degree angle northwest to Finch West station and southeast via a compound curve to Sheppard West station.

The station is located in a low-density district; however, the TTC expects mixed-use development on nearby land. The GO train connection is also expected to boost ridership.

The station building is constructed of glass, stone, and aluminum blend and has a green roof. It is designed to allow sunlight to reach the subway platform. The artwork Spin by Canadian artist Panya Clark Espinal spans the interior's walls, floors, and ceilings. Clark Espinal also created the artwork for Bayview station. The floor of the station at the platform level is constructed using striped terrazzo.

Architecture firm Aedas was commissioned to design the station; their initial plan provides twinned entrances on opposite sides of the rail corridor, each with green roofs that resemble landing strips or wings.

GO station

The GO Transit commuter rail station is at the surface on a north–south axis, perpendicular to the subway line. There is only one platform, but a second is roughed-in and will open after the ongoing construction to double-track the Barrie line is completed. There are separate surface station buildings to serve both platforms after completion.

Upon its opening, York University GO Station, located a short distance to the north, experienced a service reduction; only weekday peak-period trains serviced that station, while all trains serviced Downsview Park GO. On March 18, 2020, York University GO Station ceased operation temporarily due to the COVID-19 pandemic but in 2021, the closure was confirmed to be permanent due to low ridership.

History
The official ground breaking ceremony for the Toronto–York Spadina Subway Extension (TYSSE) was held on November 27, 2009; with tunnelling operations beginning in June 2011. The station opened on December 17, 2017, along with the rest of the extension. It opened to GO Transit service on December 30, 2017, on the same day that a major service increase was inaugurated on the Barrie line.

This station, along with the five other TYSSE stations, were the first to be opened without collectors, although collector booths were installed as per original station plans. It was also among the first eight stations to discontinue sales of legacy TTC fare media (tokens and senior/youth tickets). Presto vending machines were available at its opening to sell Presto cards and to load funds or monthly passes onto them. On May 3, 2019, this station became one of the first ten stations to sell Presto tickets via the Presto vending machines.

Nearby landmarks
Nearby landmarks include Downsview Park, which is Canada's National Urban Park and played host to World Youth Day in 2002 and the SARSstock concert in 2003. The Park is the site of an airstrip used by aircraft manufacturer Bombardier Aerospace and formerly used as Canadian Forces Base Downsview. Other points of interest include the Chesswood hockey arenas, Toronto FC's BMO training ground, Scotiabank Pond Hockey Arena, and "The Hangar" sports facility, as well as industrial lands north of Sheppard.

Surface connections

A transfer is required to connect between the subway and surface bus routes, as there is no attached bus terminal and connections are made on-street, outside the station. Buses stop on Sheppard Avenue and Vitti Street, about 140 metres from the west station building entrance.

References

External links

Line 1 Yonge–University stations
GO Transit railway stations
Railway stations in Canada opened in 2017
2017 establishments in Ontario